Theresa Ikoko is a British playwright and screenwriter of Nigerian descent. Her play Girls, about three girls abducted by terrorists in northern Nigeria, won the Alfred Fagon Award and other awards.

Ikoko later gained greater nationwide recognition, in 2019, for co-writing the feature-length coming-of-age drama Rocks with Clarie Wilson, which earned Ikoko a BAFTA Award nomination for Best Original Screenplay at the 74th British Academy Film Awards in 2021.

Early life and education 
Ikoko grew up with her mother and eight siblings in the Hackney neighbourhood of London. Ikoko has said that the label "poor" was put upon her and that communities that are poorer are misrepresented by the media as "problem areas" which ignores the potential of these areas and the fact that the negativity coming from these communities is a societal issue. She says that "poverty isn't all about suffering and darkness", and describes her upbringing as "rich in joy".

Growing up, Ikoko was inspired by authors Malorie Blackman, Sister Souljah, and Eric Jerome Dickey.

Ikoko earned an undergraduate degree in psychology from Royal Holloway, University of London, and a master's degree in Criminology and Criminal Psychology from the University of Oxford. While at Royal Holloway she contributed to a journal article on "how the conversation dynamics of women from ethnic majority and minority groups varied in different conversational contexts".

Ikoko has worked on social inclusion and community engagement projects within prisons, including facilitating creative and performing arts workshops with incarcerated persons. She worked with Islington Integrated Gangs, a London organization that focuses on gang violence in youth communities, from 2014 until 2019, when she began writing full-time.

Career

2015: Playwrighting career
Ikoko began her career as a playwright. Her first full-length play was Normal, which was produced as a staged reading as part of the Talawa Firsts' series in 2014. She came to greater attention and acclaim for her second full-length play, Girls, which won the Alfred Fagon Award for best new play in 2015; the award honors excellence in playwrights by authors of African or Caribbean ancestry living in the United Kingdom. Girls went on to be produced by Talawa Theatre Company, HighTide Theatre and Soho Theatre in 2016, before being revived for a tour in 2017 which also took in shows at the 2017 Edinburgh Fringe. At the time, Ikoko said: 

Ikoko was one of five winners of the Channel 4 Playwrights Scheme for her play Girls, which earned Ikoko a year-long playwriting fellowship the HighTide Theatre. Ikoko also received the George Devine Award for most promising playwright in 2016. Girls was produced at the Birmingham Repertory Theatre, the HighTide Festival, and at the Soho Theatre in 2016. It was Ikoko's first professionally produced play. The play addresses issues of kidnapping, forced religion, sexism, and arranged marriage as well as themes of friendship and resilience. A review in The Times called the play "pungent", "provocative", "scorchingly intelligent and as powerful as a gut punch".

Ikoko cites as inspirations playwrights debbie tucker green and Dennis Kelly, author Chinua Achebe, and recording artist and activist Sister Souljah. Speaking about her motivation for writing, Ikoko has said:

Plays 
The Race Card, 2013
Normal, 2014
Visiting Hours, 2014
Girls, 2015

2019-present: Rocks, Expansion into screenwriting
With Claire Wilson, Ikoko co-wrote the screenplay for Sarah Gavron's 2019 film Rocks, a coming-of-age drama film starring Bukky Bakray as a Black British teenage girl living in Hackney, London, whose single mother abandons her and her younger brother Emmanuel, forcing them to try to avoid being taken into social services. The film premiered at the Toronto International Film Festival in 2019 and opened in Britain on 18 September 2020, where it received critical acclaim from critics and earned Ikoko a BAFTA Award nomination for Best Original Screenplay at the 74th British Academy Film Awards in 2021, where the film was nominated for seven awards including Outstanding British Film and Best Actress in a Leading Role for Bakray, making her one of the youngest nominees for the award. Nineteen-year-old Bukky Bakray also received BAFTA Rising Star Award, becoming the youngest winner in the category.

In 2021, it was announced that Ikoko would scripting a six-part television adaptation of DJ Target's 2018 book Grime Kids, which focused on the rise of a fictional group of young teenagers growing up in the early 2000s, dreaming of being able to make their voice heard through music. Filming took place in East London and the series is due to broadcast on BBC Three and BBC iPlayer later in 2023.

Awards

References

External links 
 Trailer for Girls

21st-century British dramatists and playwrights
Living people
Year of birth missing (living people)
Place of birth missing (living people)
Black British women writers
British women dramatists and playwrights
21st-century British screenwriters
Alumni of the University of Oxford
Black British filmmakers